Donald Theophilus Beddoe (July 1, 1903 – January 19, 1991) was an American character actor.

Early years
Born in Pittsburgh, Pennsylvania, Beddoe was the son of Dan Beddoe, a Welsh classical singer, and his wife Mary. He graduated from the University of Cincinnati with bachelor's and master's degrees and taught English for three years.

Stage
Beddoe gained much theatrical experience playing in stock theater in Boston, Massachusetts, and Philadelphia, Pennsylvania. He made his Broadway acting debut in 1929, receiving top billing (over a young Spencer Tracy) in Nigger Rich. His other Broadway credits include Penny Arcade (1930), The Greeks Had a Word for It (1930), Sing High, Sing Low (1931), The Warrior's Husband (1932), Man Bites Dog (1933), The Blue Widow (1933), Birthright (1933), The Sky's the Limit (1934), Nowhere Bound (1935), First Lady (1935), Father Malachy's Miracle (1937), and Winged Victory (1943).

Film

After a decade of stage work and bit parts in films, Beddoe began more prominent film roles in the late 1930s. He was usually cast as fast-talking reporters and the like. His commercial acting career was put on hold when he served in World War II in the United States Army Air Forces, in which he performed in the Air Force play, Winged Victory.

Beddoe subsequently returned to films playing small character roles. He occasionally appeared in comedy shorts playing comic foils, such as in the Three Stooges shorts Three Sappy People and You Nazty Spy!

Beddoe appeared in more than 250 films.

Television
Beddoe portrayed Mr. Tolliver in the ABC comedy The Second Hundred Years, and he was in the cast of Life with Father on CBS.

He also was seen in dozens of television programs.  In the 1950s and 1960s, he made four appearances on Have Gun – Will Travel, three  on Lawman, three on Maverick, three on Laramie, three on Lassie, one on Mr. Adams and Eve, and three on Perry Mason including in the 1958 episode 'The Case of the Buried Clock'. He also appeared on the Western aviation series, Sky King, on The Alaskans, on the adventure series, Straightaway, and on the western series, The Tall Man.  He appeared too on the sitcoms Pete and Gladys and The Tom Ewell Show, and on the drama series, Going My Way. He guest starred on the crime drama, Richard Diamond, Private Detective and appeared on The Lone Ranger in the 1950s.

Beddoe played the outlaw Black Bart in the 1954 episode "Black Bart The PO8" of the western anthology series Death Valley Days.

In 1965, Beddoe appeared on Gunsmoke as “Mr. Halligan” in the episode “Deputy Festus” (S10E17).

During the 1970–1971 season of ABC's Nanny and the Professor, Beddoe made four appearances, three as Mr. Thatcher. In 1984, he made his final television appearance as Kris in NBC's Highway to Heaven starring Michael Landon and Victor French.

Radio
Beddoe played Pat Grady in the soap opera John's Other Wife.

Other activities
In 1968, Beddoes proposed construction of a "high-rise trailer park" to be built in Capistrano Beach, California. His plan called for making "more efficient use of land in areas where acreage is too expensive for a trailer park" by building an eight-story structure of concrete and steel and using a crane to lift trailers and insert them into their respective spaces.

Personal life
Beddoe was married to Jessie Evelyn Sebring from May 8, 1944, to her death on January 2, 1974. He later married Joyce Mathews, who had been a showgirl, on August 20, 1974. She survived him.

Death
Beddoe died of natural causes on January 19, 1991, at age 87.

Selected filmography

 The 13th Man (1937) - District Attorney's Aide (uncredited)
 There's That Woman Again (1938) - Johnson
 The Lone Wolf Spy Hunt (1939) - Inspector Thomas
 Flying G-Men (1939) - W. S. Hamilton
 Blondie Meets the Boss (1939) - Marvin Williams
 Romance of the Redwoods (1939) - Forbes
 Union Pacific (1939) - Reporter (uncredited)
 Outside These Walls (1939) - Dinky
 Mandrake the Magician (1939, Serial) - Frank Raymond
 Missing Daughters (1939) - Al Farrow
 Good Girls Go to Paris (1939) - Attorney Thomas Jamison (uncredited)
 Coast Guard (1939) - Bartender (uncredited)
 The Man They Could Not Hang (1939) - Police Lt. Shane
 Konga, the Wild Stallion (1939) - Fred Martin
 Golden Boy (1939) - Borneo
 Those High Grey Walls (1939) - Jockey
 Taming of the West (1939) - Coleman (uncredited)
 Scandal Sheet (1939) - Chick Keller
 Beware Spooks! (1939) - Nick Bruno
 The Amazing Mr. Williams (1939) - Detective Deever
 My Son Is Guilty (1939) - Duke Mason
 Cafe Hostess (1940) - Customer (uncredited)
 The Lone Wolf Strikes (1940) - Conroy
 Convicted Woman (1940) - Hank, a Reporter (uncredited)
 Blondie on a Budget (1940) - Marvin Williams
 The Doctor Takes a Wife (1940) - Morning Express Reporter (uncredited)
 The Man from Tumbleweeds (1940) - Governor Dawson
 Charlie Chan's Murder Cruise (1940) - James Ross
 Escape to Glory (1940) - Ship's Chief Engineer Anderson
 Men Without Souls (1940) - Warden Schafer
 Island of Doomed Men (1940) - Brand
 Texas Stagecoach (1940) - Tug Wilson
 The Lone Wolf Strikes (1940) - Police Doctor (uncredited)
 Manhattan Heartbeat (1940) - Preston
 Girls of the Road (1940) - Sheriff
 Military Academy (1940) - Marty Lewis
 The Secret Seven (1940) - Maj. Blinn
 Five Little Peppers in Trouble (1940) - Process Server (uncredited)
 Before I Hang (1940) - Capt. McGraw
 Glamour for Sale (1940) - Frank Regan
 So You Want to Talk (1940) - Cop
 West of Abilene (1940) - Forsyth
 Beyond the Sacramento (1940) - Warden McKay
 The Lone Wolf Keeps a Date (1940) - Big Joe Brady
 The Phantom Submarine (1940) - Bartlett
 This Thing Called Love (1940) - Tom Howland
 The Face Behind the Mask (1941) - Lt. James 'Jim' O'Hara
 Outlaws of the Panhandle (1941) - Sheriff (uncredited)
 The Lone Wolf Takes a Chance (1941) - Sheriff Haggerty
 Under Age (1941) - Albert Ward
 The Big Boss (1941) - Cliff Randall
 She Knew All the Answers (1941) - Barber
 They Dare Not Love (1941) - Second Sailor (uncredited)
 Sweetheart of the Campus (1941) - Sheriff Denby
 Two Latins from Manhattan (1941) - Don Barlow
 Texas (1941) - Sheriff
 The Blonde from Singapore (1941) - Sgt. Burns
 Unholy Partners (1941) - Michael Z. 'Mike' Reynolds
 Sing for Your Supper (1941) - Wing Boley
 Honolulu Lu (1941) - Bennie Blanchard
 Harvard, Here I Come (1941) - Hypo McGonigle
 Shut My Big Mouth (1942) - Hill
 Not a Ladies' Man (1942) - 'Professor Bigfoot' Johnson
 Meet the Stewarts (1942) - Taxi Driver
 Blondie for Victory (1942) - Mr. Larkin, Husband Who Nominates Dagwood (uncredited)
 Sabotage Squad (1942) - Chief Hanley
 The Talk of the Town (1942) - Police Chief
 Lucky Legs (1942) - Ned McLane
 Smith of Minnesota (1942) - Lew Smith
 The Boogie Man Will Get You (1942) - J. Gilbert Brampton (uncredited)
 Stand By All Networks (1942) - Enemy Agent (uncredited)
 Junior Army (1942) - Saginaw Jake
 Power of the Press (1943) - Pringle (uncredited)
 Winged Victory (1944) - Chaplain on Beach (uncredited)
 Crime, Inc. (1945) - District Attorney Dixon
 Midnight Manhunt (1945) - Detective Lt. Max Hurley
 Getting Gertie's Garter (1945) - Clancy (uncredited)
 The Notorious Lone Wolf (1946) - Stonley
 Behind Green Lights (1946) - Dr. G.F. Yager - Medical Examiner (uncredited)
 The Well-Groomed Bride (1946) - Hotel Clerk (uncredited)
 O.S.S. (1946) - Gates / Rodney Parrish
 The Best Years of Our Lives (1946) - Mr. Cameron
 California (1947) - Stark (uncredited)
 The Farmer's Daughter (1947) - Einar - Campaign Reporter
 Buck Privates Come Home (1947) - Mr. Roberts
 Calcutta (1947) - Jack Collins (uncredited)
 Blaze of Noon (1947) - Mr. Fell (uncredited)
 Welcome Stranger (1947) - Mort Elkins
 They Won't Believe Me (1947) - Thomason
 The Bachelor and the Bobby-Soxer (1947) - Joey
 If You Knew Susie (1948) - Editor (uncredited)
 Black Bart (1948) - J.T. Hall
 Another Part of the Forest (1948) - Penniman
 An Act of Murder (1948) - Pearson
 Hideout (1949) - Dr. Hamilton Gibbs
 The Crime Doctor's Diary (1949) - Phillip Bellem
 Bride of Vengeance (1949) - Councillor
 The Lady Gambles (1949) - Mr. Dennis Sutherland
 Easy Living (1949) - Jaeger
 Once More My Darling (1949) - Judge Fraser
 Flame of Youth (1949) - George Briggs
 Dear Wife (1949) - Metcalfe
 Dancing in the Dark (1949) - Barney Bassett
 The Great Rupert (1950) - Mr. Haggerty
 Gun Crazy (1950) - Man from Chicago (uncredited)
 Woman in Hiding (1950) - Fat Salesman
 Tarnished (1950) - Curtis Jellison
 Young Daniel Boone (1950) - Charlie Bryan
 Caged (1950) - Commissioner Sam Walker (uncredited)
 Beyond the Purple Hills (1950) - Amos Rayburn
 Emergency Wedding (1950) - Forbish - Floorwalker
 Southside 1-1000 (1950) - Slade Knight, Lawyer
 Cyrano de Bergerac (1950) - The Meddler
 Gasoline Alley (1951) - Walt Wallet
 The Enforcer (1951) - Thomas O'Hara
 Belle Le Grand (1951) - Smith (uncredited)
 The Company She Keeps (1951) - Jamieson
 Three Guys Named Mike (1951) - Mr. Haymes - First 'Wolf' on Plane (uncredited)
 Francis Goes to the Races (1951) - Dr. Quimby (uncredited)
 Million Dollar Pursuit (1951) - Bowen
 As Young as You Feel (1951) - Head of Sales (uncredited)
 Rodeo King and the Senorita (1951) - Mr. Richards
 Behave Yourself! (1951) - Police Sgt. O'Neill (uncredited)
 Corky of Gasoline Alley (1951) - Walt Wallet
 The Racket (1951) - Mitchell - Member of Craig's Office (uncredited)
 The Unknown Man (1951) - Ed
 Man in the Saddle (1951) - Love Bidwell (uncredited)
 Starlift (1951) - Bob Wayne (uncredited)
 Room for One More (1952) - Mr. Taylor (uncredited)
 Scandal Sheet (1952) - Pete (uncredited)
 Hoodlum Empire (1952) - Senator Blake
 The Narrow Margin (1952) - Det. Sgt. Gus Forbes
 Carson City (1952) - Zeke Mitchell
 Three for Bedroom "C" (1952) - Well-Wisher at Station (uncredited)
 Washington Story (1952) - Congressman Reciting Post Office History (uncredited)
 Carrie (1952) - Mr. Goodman
 Don't Bother to Knock (1952) - Mr. Ballew
 The Big Sky (1952) - Horse Trader (uncredited)
 The Iron Mistress (1952) - Dr. Cuny
 Blue Canadian Rockies (1952) - Cyrus Higbee (uncredited)
 Stop, You're Killing Me (1952) - Clyde Post
 The Clown (1953) - Gallagher
 The System (1953) - Jerry Allen
 Cow Country (1953) - Joe Davis
 The Band Wagon (1953) - Producer (uncredited)
 Jubilee Trail (1954) - Maury - Hotel Manager (uncredited)
 Loophole (1954) - Herman Tate
 River of No Return (1954) - Ben (uncredited)
 A Star Is Born (1954) - Studio Executive at Premiere (uncredited)
 The Steel Cage (1954) - Prison Board Member Alan Ferness (segment "The Hostages")
 Tarzan's Hidden Jungle (1955) - Mr. Johnson (uncredited)
 Wyoming Renegades (1955) - Horace Warren
 The Night of the Hunter (1955) - Walt Spoon
 The Killer Is Loose (1956) - Mr. Freeman (uncredited)
 The Rawhide Years (1956) - Frank Porter
 Behind the High Wall (1956) - Todd 'Mac' MacGregor
 Shootout at Medicine Bend (1957) - Mayor Sam Pelley
 The Joker Is Wild (1957) - Heckler at the Copacabana (uncredited)
 Toughest Gun in Tombstone (1958) - David Cooper, Assayer
 The Restless Gun (1958) as Henry Peabody in "The Suffragette"
 Bullwhip (1958) - Judge Carr
 Warlock (1959) - Dr. Wagner
 Pillow Talk (1959) - Mr. Walters (scenes deleted)
 The Wizard of Baghdad (1960) - Caliph Raschid (uncredited)
 Boy Who Caught a Crook (1961) - Colonel
 Saintly Sinners (1962) - Father Dan Sheridan
 Jack the Giant Killer (1962) - Imp
 Papa's Delicate Condition (1963) - Mayor Ghio's Assistant
 Cattle King (1963) - John - Cheyenne Club Drunk (uncredited)
 For Love or Money (1963) - Milo (uncredited)
 A Very Special Favor (1965) - Mr. Calvin Ruthledge (uncredited)
 Texas Across the River (1966) - Mr. Naylor
 The Impossible Years (1968) - Dr. Elliot Fish
 Generation (1969) - Gilbert
 How Do I Love Thee? (1970) - Dr. Littlefield
 Nickel Mountain (1984) - Doc Cathey (final film role)

References

External links

1903 births
1991 deaths
American male stage actors
American male film actors
American male television actors
Male actors from Pittsburgh
Male actors from Los Angeles
United States Army Air Forces soldiers
United States Army Air Forces personnel of World War II
20th-century American male actors
University of Cincinnati alumni
Male Western (genre) film actors
American people of Welsh descent